Gert Metz (7 February 1942 – 17 April 2021) was a German sprinter who competed at the 1968 Summer Olympics in the 100 meters, 200 meters, and 4x100 meter relay.

Metz was born in Mainz. In 1970 he ran the 100m European record in 10 seconds in Burg Gretsch.

References

1942 births
2021 deaths
West German male sprinters
Olympic athletes of West Germany
Athletes (track and field) at the 1968 Summer Olympics
Sportspeople from Mainz
European Athletics Championships medalists
Universiade medalists in athletics (track and field)
Universiade gold medalists for West Germany
Medalists at the 1965 Summer Universiade